Agung can refer to:

 Agung or agong, a set of gongs used in Philippine music
 Agung Laksono, 15th Coordinating Minister for People's Welfare of Indonesia
 Mount Agung, a volcano in Bali
 Sultan Agung of Mataram, 17th century sultan in Central Java

See also
 Yang di-Pertuan Agong, the paramount monarch of Malaysia